Rotanak Mondol ("Precious Mandala") is a district (srok) in Battambang Province, in north-western Cambodia.

Administration 
The district is subdivided into 4 communes (khum).

Communes and villages

References 

 
Districts of Battambang province